Orestia may refer to:

 Orestis (region), an ancient region of Epirotic Macedonia
 The old name for Edirne, a city in Turkey
 The Oresteia, a trilogy of Greek tragedies written by Aeschylus
 Oresteia (opera), a Russian-language opera by Sergei Taneyev
 Orestia (beetle), a genus of flea beetles